The lightweight class in the boxing at the 1964 Summer Olympics competition was the fourth-lightest class.  Lightweights were limited to those boxers weighing less than 60 kilograms. 34 boxers from 34 nations competed.

Medallists

Results

References

Sources

L